Montpelier Historic District may refer to:

Montpelier Historic District (Montpelier, Idaho), listed on the NRHP in Idaho
Montpelier Historic District (Montpelier, Mississippi), listed on the NRHP in Mississippi
Montpelier Historic District (Montpelier, Vermont), listed on the NRHP in Vermont
Montpelier Historic District (Montpelier, Virginia), listed on the NRHP in Virginia